Stephy Leon (née Grace), also known by her stage name Sarangi is an Indian television actress who appears in Malayalam-language serials.

Early life
Stephy was born as Stephy Grace to Rajan and Gracy in Kozhikode district of Kerala. She has a younger brother, Don. She is trained in classical dance and karate. She holds a degree in LL.B.

Career

In 2004, Stephy appeared as a 
Gujarati girl, Nazeen in T. V. Chandran's critically acclaimed film Kathavasheshan.

She debuted in Malayalam television through the lead role in the 2012 tele-serial Manasaveena aired in Mazhavil Manorama in which she played Manasa, a teenage girl. She played double roles in her second serial, Agniputhri, a horror series telecasted on Asianet network in the same year. From 2013 to 2014, she played the lead role in  Surya TV's popular show Ishtam. 

She played the female lead in the 2014 Malayalam film Life, directed by her husband, Leon K Thomas. She played Meenakshi, a software engineer in the movie.

In 2015, she appeared in Vivahitha, telecasted in Mazhavil Manorama. In 2016, she did double roles of Ranjini Moorthy and Bhadra in TV serial Saagaram Sakshi. In 2017, she was a contestant of reality show Dare the Fear. and Tamaar Padaar. In 2018, she hosted Thakarppan Comedy and Mimicry Mahamela in Mazhavil Manorama. She also appeared in Amrita TV's tele-serial Kshanaprabha Chanjalam in the same year.

In 2019, she played the female lead Lily in Arayannangalude Veedu aired on Flowers TV. She was also seen as a contestant in Star Magic in the same year. From 2022, she is playing the female lead in soap opera Bhavana in Surya TV.

Filmography

Films

Television

Special appearances

Webseries

Short films

Music albums

Personal life
Director Leon K Thomas married Stephy in 2014.

Notes

References

Living people
21st-century Indian actresses
Actresses in Malayalam television
Indian television actresses
Actresses in Malayalam cinema
Year of birth missing (living people)